Arkansas College was founded in Fayetteville, Arkansas in 1850 by pastor Robert Graham (1822-1901).  In 1852, it was the first school to receive a school charter from the state of Arkansas.   In 1859, William Baxter became the second president of the college.  In 1862, the college was destroyed by Confederate forces during the American Civil War.

References 

 

Universities and colleges in Arkansas
1850 establishments in Arkansas
1862 disestablishments in Arkansas